Following is a list of destinations Qantas flies to as part of its scheduled services, . It also includes destinations served by Qantas subsidiary QantasLink. Terminated destinations are also listed. Qantas flies to 60 domestic and to 29 international destinations (including seasonal destinations) in 23 countries across Africa, the Americas, Asia, Europe, and Oceania, excluding the destinations served by its subsidiaries other than QantasLink.

List

See also

 Kangaroo Route
 Transport in Australia

Notes

References

Lists of airline destinations
Oneworld destinations
Destinations